Türkoba (also, Tyurkoba) is a city and also the capital of Masally Rayon situated in Azerbaijan. It has a population of 2,700. It is also known as Masali, Masalı, Masally, and Massaly.

References 

Populated places in Masally District